Oak Grove, population: 11,793 is an unincorporated community in southern Cherokee County, Georgia, United States, near the intersection of Bells Ferry Road (former Georgia 205) and Georgia 92. Some maps instead center it at 92 and Wade Green Road, just to the west.

The name is no longer commonly used to refer to the surrounding area. The United States Postal Service designated Oak Grove as part of Acworth for mailing purposes with the creation of the ZIP Code system in the 1960s, and the Oak Grove identity slowly began to disappear with suburbanization. The "Acworth" designation is despite being immediately west of Woodstock (and closest to its main post office), and not much further northeast of Kennesaw.

The formerly volunteer Oak Grove Fire Department is now part of the professional Cherokee County system.  The only original vestiges remaining of the community are Oak Grove Elementary School, one of the oldest in the state, and the Oak Grove Station of the United States Postal Service.  Several neighborhoods near the school have Oak Grove in their names, but these are late arrivals and did not exist before the area was designated as Acworth by the United States Postal Service.

Unincorporated communities in Cherokee County, Georgia
Unincorporated communities in Georgia (U.S. state)